Andrey Aktauov is a Kazakhstani karateka. He is four-time gold medalist in the men's kumite 55 kg event at the Asian Karate Championships. In 2014, he won the gold medal in the men's kumite 55 kg event at the 2014 Asian Games held in Incheon, South Korea.

Career 

At the 2019 Asian Karate Championships held in Tashkent, Uzbekistan, he won the gold medal in the men's kumite 55 kg event.

References 

Living people
Year of birth missing (living people)
Place of birth missing (living people)
Kazakhstani male karateka
Karateka at the 2014 Asian Games
Asian Games medalists in karate
Asian Games gold medalists for Kazakhstan
Medalists at the 2014 Asian Games
21st-century Kazakhstani people